The 2017–18 ISU Short Track Speed Skating World Cup was a multi-race tournament over a season for short track speed skating. The season began on 28 September 2017 in Hungary and ended on 19 November 2017. The World Cup was organised by the ISU who also ran world cups and championships in speed skating and figure skating.

The World Cup consisted of just four competitions this year (rather than six) due to the 2018 Winter Olympics in Pyeongchang.

Calendar

Men

Budapest 28 September–1 October 2017

Dordrecht 5–8 October 2017

Shanghai 9–12 November 2017

Seoul 16–19 November 2017

Women

Budapest 28 September–1 October 2017

Dordrecht 5–8 October 2017

Shanghai 9–12 November 2017

Seoul 16–19 November 2017

World Cup standings

See also
 2018 World Short Track Speed Skating Championships

Notes

References

External links 
 ISU.org World Cup Schedule
 Official results

ISU Short Track Speed Skating World Cup
Isu Short Track Speed Skating World Cup, 2017–18
Isu Short Track Speed Skating World Cup, 2017–18
Qualification tournaments for the 2018 Winter Olympics